David I. Kaiser is an American physicist and historian of science. He is Germeshausen Professor of the History of Science at the Massachusetts Institute of Technology (MIT) and a full professor in MIT's department of physics. He also served as an inaugural Associate Dean for MIT's cross-disciplinary program in Social and Ethical Responsibilities of Computing.

Kaiser is the author or editor of several books on the history of science, including Drawing Theories Apart: The Dispersion of Feynman Diagrams in Postwar Physics (2005), How the Hippies Saved Physics: Science, Counterculture, and the Quantum Revival (2011), and Quantum Legacies: Dispatches from an Uncertain World (2020). He received the Apker Award from the American Physical Society in 1993 and was elected a Fellow of the American Physical Society in 2010. His historical scholarship has been honored with the Pfizer Award (2007) and the Davis Prize (2013) from the History of Science Society. In March 2012 he was awarded the MacVicar fellowship, a prestigious MIT undergraduate teaching award. In 2012, he also received the Frank E. Perkins Award from MIT for excellence in mentoring graduate students.

Education
Kaiser completed his AB in physics at Dartmouth College in 1993. He completed two PhDs from Harvard University. The first was in physics in 1997 for a thesis entitled "Post-Inflation Reheating in an Expanding Universe," the second in the history of science in 2000 for a thesis on "Making Theory: Producing Physics and Physicists in Postwar America."

Research
Kaiser's physics research mostly focuses on early-universe cosmology, including topics such as cosmic inflation, post-inflation reheating, and primordial black holes. He has also helped to design and conduct novel experimental tests of quantum theory, including the  "Cosmic Bell" experiments that Kaiser worked on together with Nobel laureate Anton Zeilinger, and which were featured in the documentary film Einstein's Quantum Riddle (2019).

Kaiser's historical research focuses on intersections among modern natural sciences, geopolitics, and the history of higher education during the Cold War.

In addition to his scholarly writing, Kaiser's work has appeared in the New York Times, the New Yorker magazine, and in several PBS Nova television programs.

Books
(2005). Drawing Theories Apart: The Dispersion of Feynman Diagrams in Postwar Physics. University of Chicago Press.
(2005). (ed.) Pedagogy and the Practice of Science: Historical and Contemporary Perspectives. MIT Press.
(2010). (ed.) Becoming MIT: Moments of Decision. MIT Press.
(2011). How the Hippies Saved Physics: Science, Counterculture, and the Quantum Revival. W. W. Norton, .
with Sally Gregory Kohlstedt: (2013). (eds.) Science and the American Century. University of Chicago Press.
with W. Patrick McCray: (2016). (eds.) Groovy Science: Knowledge, Innovation, and American Counterculture. University of Chicago Press.
(2020). Quantum Legacies: Dispatches from an Uncertain World. University of Chicago Press.
with Aaron S. Wright and Diana Coleman: (2022). (eds.) Theoretical Physics in Your Face: Selected Correspondence of Sidney Coleman. World Scientific.
(2022). (ed.)  'Well, Doc, You're In': Freeman Dyson's Journey through the Universe. MIT Press.
 (forth coming). American Physics and the Cold War. University of Chicago Press.

References

Further reading
Faculty website, MIT, accessed January 13, 2023.
MIT Physics Department faculty page, MIT, accessed January 13, 2023.
Kaiser, David. "Quasars to the Rescue! A Cosmic Test for Quantum Entanglement", Boston Museum of Science, 2019.
Kelly, Cynthia C. Video interview with David Kaiser, Voices of the Manhattan Project, 2014.
Kaiser, David. "Short Cuts", The London Review of Books, 33(16), August 25, 2011.
Wilkinson, Todd. "How the Hippies Saved Physics, by David Kaiser", The Christian Science Monitor, July 19, 2011.
Wisnioski, Matthew. "Let's Be Fysiksists Again", Science, 332 (6037), June 24, 2011.

Living people
21st-century American physicists
American historians of science
Massachusetts Institute of Technology School of Science faculty
Fellows of the American Physical Society
Dartmouth College alumni
Harvard University alumni
Year of birth missing (living people)
MIT Center for Theoretical Physics faculty